Galhardo is a surname. Notable people with the surname include:

Rafael Galhardo (born 1991), Brazilian footballer
Thiago Galhardo (born 1989), Brazilian footballer

See also
Fernando Galhardo Borges (born 1985), Brazilian footballer